Dave Schreyer (born September 15, 1966) is an American professional golfer. 

Schreyer was born in Atlanta, Georgia. He attended Huntingdon College.  

Schreyer has toured with the PGA Tour (1992), Nationwide Tour (1998, 2002), and the NGA Hooters Tour. He entered his first PGA Tour event in 1988 at the Pensacola Open.  Overall on the PGA Tour, he has competed in 26 events and made 4 cuts with earnings over $16,000. His best PGA Tour finish was a tie for 32nd place at the Federal Express St. Jude Classic on June 14, 1992, shooting a combined 274 (10 under par).    

Schreyer's best finish on the Nationwide Tour (formerly the Nike Tour) was a tie for 3rd place at the NIKE Fort Smith Classic on August 22, 1999 while shooting a combined 267.  

In 1997, Schreyer competed in the U.S. Open where he finished tied for 65th place.    

Schreyer has a total of 10 professional wins on the Hooters Tour and is currently second place all-time in Hooters Tour wins. He also won the Georgia Open in 1996 and 2001.

See also
1991 PGA Tour Qualifying School graduates

References

External links

American male golfers
PGA Tour golfers
Golfers from Atlanta
1966 births
Living people